Brookville may refer to any of the following:

Places

United States
 Brookville, Illinois
 Brookville, Indiana
 Brookville, Kansas
 Brookville, Michigan
 Brookville, Hunterdon County, New Jersey
 Brookville, Ocean County, New Jersey
 Brookville, New York
 Brookville, Ohio
 Brookville, Pennsylvania
 Brookville Township (disambiguation)

Canada
 Brookville, Nova Scotia
 Brookville, Ontario

Australia
 the former name of Brooklyn, Tasmania

Other uses
 Brookville Locomotive Company, manufacturer of railroad locomotives starting in 1918
 Brookville (band), a pop-band / solo-project of Andy Chase from the band Ivy

See also
 Brookville High School (disambiguation)
 Brooksville (disambiguation)
 Brookeville, Maryland